Rowena  is a small town in the far northeast of New South Wales, Australia, and lies in the Walgett Shire. It serves an agricultural community which consists of both dry and irrigated cropping as well as grazing.

A public school, which opened in 1923 and was rebuilt in 1996, serves the district. The Pokataroo railway line passes through the town.

The school has about 30 children with the last name Bartlett (2009). The town has a pub, a general store, and a post office, as well as an oval and a swimming pool.

References

Towns in New South Wales
Walgett Shire